Ashlee Weir (née Mann) (born 29 April 1988) is an Australian netball player in the ANZ Championship, playing for the New South Wales Swifts. She played in the 2009 ANZ Festival of Stars as Centre after Marianne McCormick got injured during the second half of the game. She has just recently married Kent Weir who is a seasoned cricketer, being selected in the Australian churches team in 2009.

A Baulkham Hills (BHSNA) netball junior, Ashlee returned to ANZ Championship action in 2013 after playing for the NSW Swifts in 2009.

Weir is a long-time New South Wales representative having taken the court for her home state in the 17/U, 19/U and 21/U age groups, as well as helping Manly-Warringah to three consecutive Dooleys State League's Waratah Cup titles.

Weir has also represented NSW in the Australian Netball League in both the Netball NSW Blues (2008, 2010) and NSW Waratahs (2009, 2012), most recently helping the NNSW Waratahs to finish Runners-Up in the 2012 ANL season alongside her new NSW Swifts teammates April Letton and Melissa Tallent.

Netball Career Highlights
 2009, 2012 -2013 NSW Waratahs team
 2009-2011 DOOLEYS State League Premiers with Manly Warringah
 2009 NSW Swifts
 2008, 2010 NNSW Blues ANL team
 Australian Schoolgirls Team

References
2009 New South Wales Swifts profile. Retrieved on 2009-04-22.

1988 births
Living people
Australian netball players
New South Wales Swifts players
Australian Netball League players
ANZ Championship players
Australian schoolteachers
Netball New South Wales Waratahs players
Netball New South Wales Blues players
Netball players from New South Wales
New South Wales Institute of Sport netball players
New South Wales state netball league players